Daniel Yair Delgadillo Pulido (born 5 March 1994) is a Mexican professional footballer who plays as a forward.

References

External links
 

1994 births
Living people
Correcaminos UAT footballers
Tampico Madero F.C. footballers
Inter Playa del Carmen players
Tuxtla F.C. footballers
Pioneros de Cancún footballers
Cafetaleros de Chiapas footballers
Ascenso MX players
Liga Premier de México players
Tercera División de México players
Association football forwards
Footballers from Jalisco
Mexican footballers